T. carnea may refer to:

 Terebra carnea, a sea snail
 Thelephora carnea, a wood-decay fungus
 Thelymitra carnea, a sun orchid
 Trametes carnea, a plant pathogen